Irén Marik (1905 - 1986) was a classical pianist born in Hungary.

Although she studied with composer Béla Bartók and studied at Budapest's Liszt Academy, she fled Hungary after World War II and moved to the United States, where she taught at Sweet Briar College and eventually moved to the small town of Independence, California, outside of Death Valley, where she lived with author Evelyn Eaton.

She taught piano there and occasionally recorded in studios, but for the most part gave performances in her desert home for her neighbors and friends. Irén Marik died in 1986.

External links
A Classical Pianist Who Never Showed Off
Bartók in the Desert The Art of Irén Marik
IREN MARIK (1905-1986) Hungarian-born American pianist With Videos.

1905 births
Hungarian classical pianists
Hungarian women pianists
Hungarian emigrants to the United States
Sweet Briar College faculty
1986 deaths
20th-century classical pianists
Pupils of Béla Bartók
20th-century American musicians
Jewish classical pianists
People from Inyo County, California
Women classical pianists
20th-century women composers
20th-century Hungarian male musicians
20th-century women pianists